Joseph Healey may refer to:

 Joe Healey (1910–1992), American hurdler
 Joseph G. Healey (born 1938), American priest and folklorist